Los simuladores is an Argentine television series about a small team of con artists for hire, who use their skills to solve common people's life problems. The show ran for two seasons, from 2002 to 2004. It was very popular and highly acclaimed, winning a Golden Martín Fierro Award. A number of remakes have been produced for various markets worldwide.

The original series was produced and aired by the Argentine network Telefé, and ran for two seasons (the first one with 13 episodes and the last one with 11) in 2002 and 2003. The series is occasionally shown in reruns on Telefé. Remakes were soon produced in Chile and in Spain (the latter produced by Cuatro), using some of the same actors and production members. Another remake was made in Russia.  Since 2008, Sony Pictures Television International has produced a remake for Mexican television network Televisa.

It was announced on 18 March 2022 that a film version and sequel to the TV series will be released in 2024, with the return of the original cast and Damián Szifron as the screenwriter and director.

Premise
The series centers on a team of four associates who run a "simulation" business, solving the problems and needs of their clients by staging simulacros ("simulations", or confidence tricks) aimed at staging events that help the client come on top of the situation. The price the team charges for its services is exactly twice the cost of the simulation, as well as the client's promise to participate in future simulations. This leads to characters who appeared in previous episodes reappearing in later episodes as secondary actors and helpers for the team, giving the show a degree of continuity. The underlying philosophy used by the team is that sometimes what's legal is not fair, and sometimes what's fair is not legal.

In the second season of the show, a second Simuladores team is introduced. This group, known as the "B-Team" and composed of former clients of the original team (who had appeared on season 1), has been created to take over smaller cases and free the original team for larger and more demanding assignments.

The show is influenced by the literature work Los árboles mueren de pie (1949) by Alejandro Casona. This show shared elements with American 80s series like Stingray, The A-Team, Vengeance Unlimited and The Equalizer.

Cast and characters

 Federico D'Elía as Mario Santos:The head of the team, responsible for planning, logistics and contacting the clients. He is the most refined member. He is fond of drinking earl grey tea, listening to classical music, reading classic French literature, and eating fine, cosmopolitan cuisine. After each successful operation he appears smoking a cigar, often lit by the person that was fooled. He is the only member of the team to be a widower, since his wife died roughly five years before the start of the series.
 Alejandro Fiore as Pablo Lamponne:The member in charge of finding the materials and elements needed for the simulations. He has a black mixed-breed dog, "Betún" ("Shoe Polish"), who plays a role in several simulations. He is the most reserved member of the team, being very uncomfortable talking about his feelings or his private life.
 Diego Peretti as Emilio Ravenna:The team's leading "actor", who does most of the characterizations required for the simulation. He usually takes the name of "Máximo Cozzetti", which he took from a fraudulent lender who ran an illegal lending business. He's a charismatic playboy, shown to be dating multiple women at the same time.
 Martín Seefeld as Gabriel Medina:The team's investigator, in charge of obtaining information about the team's clients, the intended targets of the simulation and the elements of the problem the team must solve. He is the most sensitive member of the team, appearing to be very tough and stoic in public, but in truth being very openly emotional and kindhearted with his friends and family. He became divorced shortly before the time when the show takes place; something that he copes with throughout the first season.

D'Elía, Seefeld, Peretti, and Fiore met while making an old action series, "Poliladron" in the mid-1990s. Diego Peretti is a psychiatrist in real life. The actor who plays Feller, Jorge D'Elía, is in real life Federico D'Elía's father. Santos is played by the same actor in the Argentine and Spanish versions.

Most of the characters' last names are from people known by producer Damian Szifron, in most cases from his childhood in Ramos Mejía.

On the remakes of the show in other countries sometimes the names of the main characters are conserved.

When Los simuladores are summoned by Santos, their cell phones ring like the show's opening theme, "Cité Tango", by Ástor Piazzolla.

Episode guide

Season 1 (2002)
Tarjeta de navidad ("Christmas Card"): The team helps a struggling artist to get back together with his estranged wife.
Diagnóstico rectoscópico ("Rectoscopic Diagnosis"): The team helps a man to get rid of a loan shark and his thugs.
Seguro de desempleo ("Unemployment Insurance"): The team helps an old man to get his job back after being unceremoniously fired by his boss for being too old.
El testigo español ("The Spanish Witness"): The team helps a woman to get rid of a nosy, Spanish former lover who is trying to pressure her into restarting their affair.
El joven simulador ("The Young Pretender"): The team is hired by a man, whose wife is sick and needs to relax, so that they can help his son to pass six hard exams in a single week, thus keeping him from flunking the year and stressing out his sick mother.
El pequeño problema del gran hombre: ("The Big Man's Small Problem"): The team must help the President of Argentina to get his self-esteem (and his sexual performance) back up.
Fuera de cálculo ("Out of Calculations"): While trying to extract some blackmail material from a safety deposit box, the team gets caught up in a botched bank robbery and must help the thieves escape in order to save their lives and those of the other hostages.
El Pacto Copérnico ("The Copernicus Pact"): An adulterous lawyer hires the team to make his wife want to leave him, clearing his conscience for cheating on her.
El último héroe ("The Last Hero"): The team works to take all the money from a swindler who poses as an artistic agent, convincing him to enter a fake Survivor-like reality show which will keep him in the Chaco jungle for a full year.
Los impresentables ("The Unpresentables"): The team helps a girl's crass, lower-class family look good for a dinner with her boyfriend's upper-class family.
El colaborador foráneo ("The Foreign Collaborator"): The team helps a neighborhood get rid of a corrupt police officer who terrorizes the vicinity.
Marcela & Paul ("Marcela and Paul"): The team helps a recently divorced woman get over her depression by arranging a romantic night with whom she believes to be Paul McCartney.
Un trabajo involuntario ("An Involuntary Job"): The team must work for free to free Santos from a mobster who kidnaps him after refusing a job request..

Season 2 (2003)
Los cuatro notables ("The Remarkable Four"): To help the family of an ailing man, the team tries to convince an HMO doctor-turned-businessman that he has been nominated to the Nobel Prize for an old idealistic paper he wrote in his youth.
Z 9000 ("Z 9000"): The team convinces an abusive husband that he has a murderous clone stalking him.
La gargantilla de las cuatro estaciones ("The Necklace of the Four Seasons"): The team is contacted by a man that can't stop cheating on the woman he loves; however, they pretend to refuse the case and he becomes part of the simulation.
El Clan Motul ("The Motul Clan"): Simulating a vampires story, the team saves a retirement house from being sold.
El vengador infantil ("The Child Avenger"): The team helps a young comic-book lover to gain self-esteem and resist a bully.
El matrimonio mixto ("The Mixed Marriage"): A Jewish boy and a catholic girl hire the team to convince their respective parents that a mixed marriage is not a bad idea.
El Gran Desafío ("The Big Challenge"): U.S. agents capture the members of the B-Team after taking them for terrorists -which they were pretending to be for the purposes of a simulation-, leading the original team to try to infiltrate the FBI itself to free them.
Fin de semana de descanso ("Holiday Weekend"): Taking a small vacation, the team unmasks a crime being committed by a couple, the Sherlock Holmes way.
El debilitador social ("The Social Debilitator"): The team simulates a trial against a model manager that encourages the girls into unhealthy eating habits, charging him for "pre-crimes against Humanity".
El anillo de Salomón ("The Ring of Solomon"): A famous orchestra conductor hires the team to get rid of an obnoxious classical music fan.
Episodio final ("Final Episode"): A two-part episode. The victim from the ninth chapter of the first season comes back from the jungle seeking to kill the team for having tricked him and stolen from him almost one million pesos (at that time, almost USD200,000). The team then makes a simulation to make him believe that it was a test, and then train him to kill Osama Bin Laden. The team also works to convince an ambitious corporate employee to return home and help his father and sister with the family business. This is the team's final job, as they decide to quit for some time and go their separate ways.

References

External links
 
 Los Simuladores Argentina Brief review 
 Los Simuladores Spain Official Website Nacho Barahona Film Editor (1st Season) 
 Los Simuladores Spain Homepage at Cuatro 

Golden Martín Fierro Award winners
2002 Argentine television series debuts
2003 Argentine television series endings
Argentine drama television series
2000s Argentine television series
Fictional con artists
Television shows set in Buenos Aires